Friðrik Sophusson (born 18 October 1943 in Reykjavík) is an Icelandic politician and company director. He was the former director of Icelandic state-run energy firm Landsvirkjun.

Career
Friðrik graduated from the University of Iceland in 1972, as a lawyer and was managing director of Management Association of Iceland between 1972 and 1978 when he took a seat in Parliament. was Minister of Industry and Commerce from 8 July until 28 December 1987 and Minister of Finance from 30 April 1991 until 16 April 1998. From 1998 until 2009 he was the director of Landsvirkjun. In 2010 he was announced as the chairman of the board of directors of Íslandsbanki, one of the three major Icelandic banks.

Other activities
In his political career he has been a member of various committees and boards, e.g. the central committee of the conservative Independence Party. As director of Iceland's state-run energy firm Landsvirkjun, Friðrik has been among the most active proponents of the controversial hydro-electric dam at Kárahnjúkar in eastern Iceland.

See also 
Politics of Iceland
Kárahnjúkar Hydropower Plant

References 

Fridrik Sophusson
Fridrik Sophusson
1943 births
Living people
Fridrik Sophusson
Fridrik Sophusson